Owjan (also Romanized as Owjān) is a village in Qareh Chay Rural District, in the Central District of Saveh County, Markazi Province, Iran. At the 2006 census, its population was 668, in 149 families.

References 

Populated places in Saveh County